WREC (600 kHz) is a commercial AM radio station in Memphis, Tennessee.  It broadcasts a talk radio format and is owned by iHeartMedia, Inc.  The studios and offices are on Thousand Oaks Boulevard in Memphis.  WREC is West Tennessee's primary entry point station for the Emergency Alert System.

WREC is powered at 5,000 watts.  It uses a directional antenna with a two-tower array.  The transmitter is on North Watkins Street, near Interstate 40 in Memphis.  Programming is simulcast on 250-watt FM translator W221CR at 92.1 MHz.  The station is also heard on an HD radio digital subchannel of co-owned 102.7 WEGR.

Programming

Talk shows
WREC airs mostly nationally syndicated shows from Premiere Networks, a subsidiary of parent company iHeartMedia.  Weekdays start with This Morning, America's First News with Gordon Deal followed by two hours of The Ben Ferguson Show.  Ferguson is also heard for an hour in the afternoon.  Also on the schedule are The Sean Hannity Show, The Glenn Beck Program, The Clay Travis and Buck Sexton Show, The Mark Levin Show, The Jesse Kelly Show, Ground Zero with Clyde Lewis and Coast to Coast AM with George Noory.  

Weekends feature shows on money, real estate, gardening and home improvement, with religious programs heard on Sunday mornings.  Nationally syndicated shows from Kim Komando and Bill Cunningham round out the weekend schedule.  Most hours begin with an update from the Fox News Radio Network.

Sports
In the fall of 2006, WREC assumed the broadcast rights for the Memphis Tigers football and basketball teams of the University of Memphis. Before carrying the Tigers, the station had long been the Memphis affiliate for Tennessee Volunteers football and basketball.

History

WOAN
According to Federal Communications Commission (FCC) records, WREC's origin dates to station WOAN, which consolidated with WREC in 1930, making WREC the oldest radio station in Memphis, going on the air a year before WMC.

WOAN was first licensed on November 21, 1922 to "Vaughn Conservatory of Music (James D. Vaughn)" in Lawrenceburg, Tennessee, operating on the "entertainment" wavelength of 360 meters (833 kHz). Its call letters were randomly assigned from a sequential roster of available call signs.

WREC

WREC was first licensed on January 17, 1924, as KFNG, owned by electrical engineer and radio dealer Hoyt Wooten. The original call letters were also randomly assigned, from an alphabetical roster of available call signs starting with "K", which were normally only issued to stations located west of the Mississippi River. KFNG operated from a 10-watt transmitter in Wooten's father's home in Coldwater, Mississippi. (Some station histories report a start of broadcasting activities by Hoyt Wooten in September, 1922.) In 1925, the station adopted its current WREC call letters, and later moved to Whitehaven, Tennessee, now a part of Memphis.

Consolidation of WREC and WOAN

WREC began sharing the 600 AM frequency with WOAN. In 1929 the two stations began joint operations, with WREC moving to studios in the basement of the Peabody Hotel in downtown Memphis, where it would remain for over 40 years. In 1930, the two stations were formally consolidated with the joint call sign of WREC-WOAN. On May 15, 1933, after the Federal Radio Commission requested that stations using only one of their assigned call letters drop those that were no longer in regular use, WOAN was eliminated and the station reverted to just WREC.

WREC was an affiliate of the CBS Radio Network.  It carried CBS dramas, comedies, news, sports, soap operas, game shows and big band broadcasts during the "Golden Age of Radio."

In 1956 WREC added a TV station, CBS affiliate WREC-TV 3 (now WREG-TV), and in 1967, it put an FM station on the air at 102.7, WREC-FM (now WEGR).  Wooten sold his stations to Cowles Communications in 1963, earning a handsome return on his original investment.  As network programming moved from radio to television in the 1960s, WREC switched to a full service, middle of the road format of popular adult music, news and sports.  In the 1980s, it began reducing music shows and replacing them with talk shows, until the transition to full time talk was complete in the 1990s.

In 1996, Clear Channel Communications acquired WREC and WEGR.  Clear Channel changed its name to iHeartMedia in 2014.

References

External links

 FCC History Cards for WREC (covering WOAN for 1922-1930 and WREC/WREC-WOAN for 1924-1981)

REC
American Basketball Association flagship radio stations
IHeartMedia radio stations
1922 establishments in Tennessee
Radio stations established in 1922
News and talk radio stations in the United States
Radio stations licensed before 1923 and still broadcasting